Ledama Olekina is a Kenyan politician who serves as the senator for Narok County. Olekina was elected on an Orange Democratic Movement ticket in the 8 August 2017, general elections in Kenya. He was born and raised in Oloombokishi, a small village near Narok, Kenya, on 11 November 1974.  As of 2020, he resides in Eor Ekule, Enkanasa Village. Olekina was educated at Narok High School and thereafter proceeded to the United States where he earned a Bachelor of Arts Degree in Political Science and English Communication from The University of Massachusetts in Boston in 2002. He is the founder of Maasai Education Discovery, an education center for girls. Olekina has been involved in efforts to conserve the Mau Forest in Kenya. He is the most followed maasai politician on Facebook and Twitter,

Controversy 
In 2018, Olekina was cautioned by Kenya's National Cohesion and Integration Commission) against making issuing utterances bordering on incitement against the Kipsigis community. He has also been accused by other Kenyan politicians of fuelling hate against one community after the Senator claimed that most state jobs were being awarded to one community in Kenya. These accusations made him one of the most followed maasai politician on both Facebook and Twitter.

References

External links
Olekina Ledama on Twitter

University of Massachusetts Boston alumni
1974 births
Kenyan activists
Kenyan educators
Living people
Maasai people
People from Narok County
Kenyan politicians